Robert Lesser or Bobby Lesser (born October 22, 1942) is an American actor.

Lesser was born in New York City, and lives in Santa Barbara, California. His earliest work dates back to 1967 with "David Holzman's Diary", directed by Jim McBride. His latest movies include the Japanese film "Best Wishes for Tomorrow" and post-production "Painting in the Rain". Lesser has worked with Bruce Willis, Ed Harris, Alan Arkin, Arnold Schwarzenegger, Matthew Broderick, Dennis Quaid, Penelope Ann Miller, and Richard Mulligan. He is well known in the Santa Barbara theater community.

In 2011, The Hollywood Reporter published an open letter from Lesser to the Internet Movie Database after they repeatedly refused to correct his birthdate, which they had listed as May 28, 1938.  They have since corrected the date.

Selected theaters
The New York Shakespeare Festival's Richard the Third, on Broadway
The Soft Touch directed by Alan Arkin
Rubbers and Yanks 3 Detroit 0 Top of the Seventh, American Place Theatre by Alan Arkin.
Performances at the Yale Repertory's Winterfest
Geography of a Horse Dreamer, by Sam Shepard - The Manhattan Theatre Club.
Steven Berkoff's: Kvetch, and God's Country, Odyssey Theatre, Los Angeles.
To Gillian, by Michael Pressman (West Coast Premier).
Santa Barbara area:
Rubicon Theatre: My Antonia, In All Honesty
Center Stage Theatre: The Goat or Who is Sylvia, by Edward Albee and Krapp's Last Tape by Samuel Beckett.
Ensemble Theatre Company: The Fourth Wall, Communicating Doors, The Last Night of Ballyhoo, The Weir, An Inspector Calls, and The Cripple of Inishmaan.

Selected films

Selected television
Charlie's Angels, (1981) - Burt Walker
The New Odd Couple, (1982–1983) - Harry Price / Stage Manager
St. Elsewhere, (1987)
Married... with Children, (1991) - Bum - Edwin Johanson
Herman's Head, (1992) - Troy Michaels
Empty Nest, (1990–1995) - Dr. Perry Smith / Russell
Bosom Buddies, (1981)

References

External links
 

1942 births
American male film actors
American male television actors
Living people